Seven Nations may refer to:

Seven Nations of Canada, a historical First Nations confederacy
Seven Nations (band), a Celtic rock band
Seven Nations (album), a 2000 album by the band
"Seven Nation Army", a 2003 song by the White Stripes
Seven Nations (Bible), nations that according to the Hebrew Bible lived in the Land of Canaan prior to the arrival of the Israelites